RAF West Drayton was a non-flying Royal Air Force station in West Drayton, within the London Borough of Hillingdon, which served as the main centre for military air traffic control in the United Kingdom. It was co-located with the civilian London Air Traffic Control Centre to provide a vital link between civil and military flying and airspace requirements. Following the departure of the remaining civil and military air traffic control systems by 2008, the site was closed and demolished for a new residential development.

History
West Drayton RAF station was operating in 1918 as an RAF Air Construction Corps (A.C.C.) depot and was located in the Stockley area of the Yiewsley Urban District. Before the creation of the RAF on 1 April 1918, buildings at Stockley were occupied by the Royal Naval Air Service (R.N.A.S.). By October 1920 the depot accommodation buildings used by the R.N.A.S. had been vacated and both the Yiewsley Urban District Council and the Uxbridge Rural District Council requested for the buildings to be used for the housing of demobilised soldiers and sailors. However this was declined by the Secretary of State for War and Air, Winston Churchill.

Between 1920 and 1923 public sales by auction of large quantities of the depot stores were held on behalf of the U.K. Government. 
   
On 1 September 1924 the West Drayton RAF Station became an reception depot for new entrants. Wing Commander Alexander Shekleton D.S.O. took command of the depot.

On 30 October 1939 it became a Women's Auxiliary Air Force (WAAF) new-entrant depot.

The station was used to house 700 athletes competing at the 1948 Summer Olympics in London, together with RAF Uxbridge and Richmond.

From 1951 until 1962 the station accommodated the 3911th Air Base Group United States Air Force in addition to RAF personnel.

Air Traffic Control Operations

The station became a unit of No. 11 Group RAF in January 1965.

RAF West Drayton was also the home of the Linesman System, hence the main Operations Building being known as the L1. The system used Link 1 to exchange Air Defence data between the UK and Europe. There were links to Continental Early Warning (CEW) sites at: Reitan, Maakeroy, Vaedbek, Nieuw-Milligen, Glons and Doulons.

Aerospace System Operators (ASOps or Scopies) were responsible for the tracking and identification of every flight – military and civil, that entered or left the UK Air Defence Region (UKADR). This was a labour-intensive task in the days before automatic initiation and tracking systems, but a big improvement on the plotting table and small perspex plaques with information written on them. The School of Fighter Control continued to teach plotting and writing backwards until 1990.

The School of Fighter Control moved to RAF West Drayton from RAF Bawdsey, training junior officers to be Fighter Controllers. In addition to teaching RAF officers, foreign and commonwealth students also attended, and there was even one course of Yugoslavian MiG pilots.

The station also became responsible for collecting and analysing many reports of UFOs after information was received by the Ministry of Defence.

Closure and redevelopment

West Drayton ceased being an RAF station in April 1994. At this time the English Electric Lightning acting as a gate guardian was scrapped; only the nose section was retained and sent to the Malta Aviation Museum. Air traffic control services remained, although the section responsible for airspace outside London moved to Swanwick in Hampshire in 2002. The remaining operation was named the London Terminal Control Centre. RAF personnel remained on the site, as military air traffic control functions for the eastern side of England remained. In November 2007 the remaining civil air traffic control services moved to Swanwick and were joined by the military operation in January 2008. National Air Traffic Services vacated the site in 2008. The MT section of the Queen's Colour Squadron relocated to RAF Northolt.

Plans for 773 homes, a nursing home, shops and offices were approved by the London Borough of Hillingdon in July 2010. Inland Homes named the new development "Drayton Garden Village", aiming to create a 1930s style village. Demolition work of the former air traffic control site was carried out between 2010 and 2011. The Drayton Garden Village development opened officially on 21 October 2011, with a ceremony led by the Mayor of Hillingdon. A later housing development, Park West, was constructed on the western side of the site.

See also
 Linesman/Mediator
 London Area Control Centre
 ACE High

References

External links
 Photographs of the station
 Closure ceremony for RAF West Drayton (YouTube)
 Lightning gate guardian

1924 establishments in the United Kingdom
Former buildings and structures in the London Borough of Hillingdon
West Drayton
Transport in the London Borough of Hillingdon
West Drayton